Pa-ye Takht-e Talkor (also Romanized as Pā-ye Takht-e Talkor; also known as Pātakht, Pāyetakht, and Pāytakht) is a village in Qilab Rural District, Alvar-e Garmsiri District, Andimeshk County, Khuzestan Province, Iran. At the 2006 census, its population was 69, in 11 families.

References 

Populated places in Andimeshk County